Anna Yamazaki (born 19 December 1999) is a Japanese sailor. She competed in the 49er FX event at the 2020 Summer Olympics.

References

External links
 
 

1999 births
Living people
Japanese female sailors (sport)
Olympic sailors of Japan
Sailors at the 2020 Summer Olympics – 49er FX
Sportspeople from Yokohama